Clayton Hare (July 13, 1909 – December 11, 2001) was a Canadian music teacher, conductor, and violinist. He was the third principal conductor of the New Brunswick Youth Orchestra and taught at a number of universities including Mount Allison University, the University of Portland, and Mount Royal College.

Early life
Hare was born in Ontario. He studied violin with Austrian immigrant Greza de Grez.

Career
As a young man Hare performed as a concert violinist.

Hare joined the music department at Mount Allison University in Sackville New Brunswick, and took over the direction of the Mount Allison College Symphony Orchestra in 1945. In 1949 he founded the Calgary Symphony Orchestra, composed largely of musicians from the Mount Allison music program. The Symphony played a mix of contemporary and classical music. Hare continued to conduct the orchestra for a number of years, while teaching string and orchestral classes at Mount Royal College. He and his wife, pianist Dorothy Swetnam (a survivor of the Halifax explosion), performed concerts as a duet.

Hare later taught music at the University of Portland. While there he wrote music reviews for the Portland Reporter newspaper.

References

Male conductors (music)
1909 births
2001 deaths
Academic staff of Mount Allison University
University of Portland faculty
Boston University faculty
University of Maine faculty
Alumni of the Royal Academy of Music
Canadian educators
Canadian classical violinists
Male classical violinists
20th-century classical violinists
20th-century Canadian conductors (music)
20th-century Canadian male musicians
20th-century Canadian violinists and fiddlers
Canadian male violinists and fiddlers